The Frauen-Regionalliga is the third-tier of German women's association football. The Frauen-Regionalliga is made up of five separate leagues. Until 2017, the champion of each league was promoted to the 2. Frauen-Bundesliga for the next season, so were the winners of two promotion groups in 2018. Since 2019, the three winners of promotion play-offs qualify for next season's 2. Bundesliga.

Mode 

In all divisions a season consists of two rounds. A club meets every other club one time in each round, once at home and once away. The number of games thus depends on the number of teams in the division, ranging from ten in the south to fourteen in the west. The season typically starts in August or September, with the first round finishing in December. The second round then starts in February and ends in May or June. Occasionally the first games of the second round are held in December, though.

The final standings are determined by points a club has gained during a season. A win is worth 3 points, a draw 1, and a loss 0. The tiebreakers are in descending order goal difference, goals for, and head-to-head results. If the tie cannot be broken a tiebreaking game is held.

Until the end of the 2016–17 season the divisional champions were promoted the 2nd Bundesliga. After the 2017–18 season, two groups of four teams played a promotion round in which the group winners were also promoted, as the 2nd Bundesliga contracted to one division for the following season. Since 2018–19, the three winners of two-legged matches earn promotion. If a division champion   declines to participate in the play-offs, its intended opponent is promoted instead and if the champion, especially a reserve team of a 2nd Bundesliga club, is ineligible, the next-placed, eligible club accedes to the promotion round. If the play-off winner declines or is refused promotion, the loser qualifies automatically for the 2nd Bundesliga in the next season and if the play-off loser also declines or is denied, no team is promoted and the number of relegations from the 2nd Bundesliga is reduced. There is no rule to which division of the 2nd Bundesliga a team is allocated and the German Football Association decides that from season to season. The number of teams relegated to the third tier depends on the clubs relegated from the 2nd Bundesliga. In a season no clubs might be relegated to a specific division of the Regionalliga while another division receives three new teams due to relegation.  Promotion and relegation between the Regionalliga and the league beneath serves as a cushion to keep the divisions of the Regionalliga at the size they are supposed to have.

Regionalliga Nord 
The Regionalliga Nord is the highest regional division in northern Germany. Teams belonging to one of the regional football associations of Lower Saxony, Schleswig-Holstein, Hamburg, or Bremen compete in the league. The division comprises fourteen teams.

History 

Until 1986 the highest leagues in northern Germany were the Landesligas, one each for Bremen, Hamburg, Lower Saxony, and Schleswig-Holstein. The champions of these divisions automatically qualified for the national championship. When in 1986 the Oberliga Nord was established the best teams from each regional association were admitted to the new league. Although the best team from each association still qualified for the national championship this was determined by the final standings of the Oberliga Nord.

When in 1990 the Frauen-Bundesliga was incepted the Regionalliga automatically moved to the second tier. The best teams from the Regionalliga qualified for the Bundesliga Nord in its first season. Afterwards the champions of the division had to play against teams from the Regionalliga West and Nordost for promotion to the Bundesliga Nord. Since 1997 teams thus qualify for the unified Bundesliga. In 1994 the name of the league was changed to Regionalliga, but the change incurred no further consequences. With the introduction of the 2nd Bundesliga in 2004 the Regionalliga Nord moved to the third tier.

Regionalliga Nordost 
The Regionalliga Nordost is the highest regional division in north-eastern Germany. Teams belonging to one of the regional football associations of Berlin, Brandenburg, Mecklenburg-Vorpommern, Saxony, Saxony-Anhalt, or Thuringia compete in the league. The division comprises twelve teams.

History 

The Oberliga was established in 1990 as the national league of the GDR. When the GDR was united with West Germany in the same year play in the Oberliga continued. Late in 1990 the GDR football association was merged into the German Football Association and—just as in men's football—at the end of the season the top two teams of the former GDR top division were admitted to the Bundesliga. Afterwards the teams from West Berlin were integrated into the Oberliga Nordost. In the following seasons the champion from the Regionalliga Nordost had to compete with the champions of the Regionalligas Nord and West for promotion to the Bundesliga Nord.

Since 1997 teams thus qualify for the unified Bundesliga. In 1995 the name of the league was changed to Regionalliga, but the change incurred no further consequences. With the introduction of the 2nd Bundesliga in 2004 the Regionalliga Nordost moved to the third tier.

Regionalliga Süd 
The Regionalliga Süd is the highest regional division in southern Germany. Teams belonging to one of the regional football associations of Bavaria, Baden, South Baden, Württemberg, and Hesse compete in the league. The division comprises fourteen teams.

History 

Until 1986 the highest leagues in southern Germany were the Oberligas, one each for Bavaria, Hesse, and Baden-Württemberg. The champions of these divisions had to play against teams from the other Landesligas in South Germany for promotion to the Bundesliga. When the 2nd Bundesliga was incepted in 2004 the Regionalliga Süd was dissolved and the teams were either promoted to the 2nd Bundesliga or relegated to the Oberligas.
The Regionalliga was reestablished in 2007 and again comprises the best teams from Bavaria, Hessen, and Baden-Württemberg.

Regionalliga Südwest 
The Regionalliga Südwest is the highest regional division in south-western Germany. Teams belonging to one of the regional football associations of Rhineland, Saarland, or Southwest compete in the league. The division comprises fourteen teams.

History 

Until 1990 the highest leagues in south-western Germany were the Landesligas, one each for Rhineland, Saarland, and Southwest. The champions of these division automatically qualified for the national championship. When in 1990 the Bundesliga was incepted the Landesligas automatically moved to the second tier. The best teams from the Landesligas in south-western Germany played in relegation playoffs against each other for promotion to the Bundesliga South. In 1996 the Oberliga Südwest was established as a league between the Bundesliga and the Landesligas. The best teams from the Landesligas Rhineland, Saarland, and Southwest qualified for this league. Although the southwestern region was then presented by only one division the champion of that division had to play relegation playoffs to be admitted to the Bundesliga as the Bundesliga divisions were merged in 1997 to form a unified league. Only two slots for promotion were thus available.

In 2000 the name of the league was changed to Regionalliga, but the change incurred no further consequences. With the introduction of the 2nd Bundesliga in 2004 the Regionalliga Südwest moved to the third tier.

Regionalliga West 
The Regionalliga West is the highest regional division in western Germany. Teams belonging to one of the regional football associations of Middle Rhine, Lower Rhine, or Westphalia compete in the league. Essentially that means, that teams from North Rhine-Westphalia compete in the league. The division comprises fourteen teams.

History 

From its inception in 1985 until 1990 the Regionalliga West was the highest league for women's football in western Germany. The champion qualified for the German women's football championship. When in 2000 the Bundesliga was incepted the best teams of the Regionalliga automatically qualified for the northern division of the Bundesliga. Afterwards the champion from the western division of the Regionalliga had to compete in relegation playoffs with the champion of the northern and north-eastern divisions for a spot in the Bundesliga. When the Bundesliga was reformed to a single division in 1997 the Western German champion Wattenscheid 09 had to vie for qualification with the north-eastern champion as well as two teams which had achieved midtable results in the 1996–97 Bundesliga season. In 2003 the Regionalliga moved to the third tier when the 2. Bundesliga was established.

Champions 
Sources:

1985–1986

1986–1990

1990–1996

1996–2000

2000–2004

2004–2007

2007–

References 

 
3